Automatic visa revalidation is one of a handful of exceptions to the general rule that a person who is not a United States citizen or lawful permanent resident can only lawfully enter the United States if he/she has a valid visa. According to automatic visa revalidation, people on some non-immigrant visa statuses who visit Canada, Mexico or some adjacent islands close to the United States for a period of less than 30 days can re-enter the United States based on a valid Form I-94 even if their visa has expired.

Rules

A person is eligible for automatic visa revalidation provided the following conditions are met:

 The underlying authorization for the current status continues to be valid (such as the Form I-129 for non-immigrant workers or Form I-20 for students in F status).
 The person’s absence from the United States was 30 days or less.
 The person did not visit any countries other than Mexico or Canada in that period. People on F visa or J visa statuses are also allowed to have visited adjacent islands to the United States (i.e., the Caribbean Islands).
 The person does not have a pending (or rejected) application for a new visa. Since it is not possible to renew a non-immigrant visa in the United States a person on a non-immigrant visa may travel to a nearby country to apply for a new visa. However, such a person becomes ineligible for automatic visa revalidation based on the rules, so automatic visa revalidation cannot be used as a fallback option for somebody trying to renew an expired visa.
 The person is not a citizen of one of the countries designated by the US as a state sponsor of terrorism. As of 2018, the list includes four countries: North Korea (designated November 20, 2017), Iran (designated January 19, 1984), Sudan (designated December 29, 1979), and Syria (designated August 12, 1993).

Similar exceptions

 The Visa Waiver Program allows nationals of 40 countries to enter the United States without visas, but they can enter only for short-term business/tourism trips, under conditions similar to those governing B visas.
 Some people currently in the United States can apply for advance parole that allows them to leave and re-enter the United States without a valid visa. Advance parole is not a generic re-entry permit.

Relation with change of status 

Automatic visa revalidation also applies to cases where the applicant never acquired a visa for his or her current non-immigrant status but rather transitioned through it by filing the appropriate form to change non-immigrant status (such as Form I-129 or Form I-539). Instead of the "visa", what gets revalidated is the change of status, and therefore in lieu of the visa the applicant must carry the Form I-797 Approval Notice in addition to all the other supporting documentation. In particular, it does not matter if the applicant has never acquired a visa for the new status.

References

Visa policy of the United States